Watch My Mouth is the second album by rapper Cazwell. Watch My Mouth is his first full-length album, with eight bonus tracks. Cazwell described the music of the album as "dance more than anything else. There are some hip hop elements, but I wouldn’t call it a hip hop album. All the songs are different because I worked with different producers. Ultimately it’s a lighthearted dance rap album."

Track listing
"Watch My Mouth" (3:05)
"Tonight" (3:25)
"All Over Your Face" (5:16)
"Get My Money Back" (feat. Lost Daze) (2:46)
"I Seen Beyoncé" (feat. Jonny Makeup) (3:17)
"Get Into It" (feat. Amanda Lepore) (3:59)
"I Buy My Socks On 14th Street" (3:29)
"The Sex That I Need" (3:46)
"Mission Possible" (feat. The Ones) (3:04)
"Knocked Out" (3:22)
"Limosine" (feat. Risqué) (2:59)
"Gettin' Over" (3:51)

Bonus tracks
"Spin That (Interlude)" (1:33)
"I Buy My Socks On 14th Street" (Old School Mix)" (3:22)
"Tonight" (Freestyle Mix) (2:56)
"Get My Money Back" (GoodandEvil Mix) (feat. Lost Daze) (2:48)
"Watch My Mouth" (Morgan Page Mix) (7:14)
"All Over Your Face" (Greasy Grimey Two Timey Mix) (5:50)
"I Seen Beyoncé" (Mixmaster F Hot Tracks Mix) (feat. Jonny Makeup) (5:09)

Online bonus track
"The Sex That I Need (Craig C's Master Mix)" which is 6:58 long was made available as a download digital bonus only.

References

External links
Amazon.com listing

2009 albums
Cazwell albums